Jason Bryce Roberts is an Australian weightlifter. He competed for Australia at 1990 Commonwealth Games in the Heavyweight division, winning three Silver Medals in the snatch, clean and jerk and overall events.

His anti-drugs stand was noted in the 1990 Australian Senate inquiry into drugs in sport. In 1992, Jason Roberts was vocally against the importation of Rumanian and Bulgarian weightlifters, specifically for the Barcelona Olympics, on the grounds that they had no interest in migrating to Australia. Subsequently, following the Barcelona Games, most of them left Australia. Michael Noonan, the Executive Director of Australian Weightlifting Federation between 1990–1993, confirmed that AWF "bought" and supported the Bulgarians and Romanian weightlifters to come to Australia in the 1990s.

References

Australian male weightlifters
Commonwealth Games silver medallists for Australia
Place of birth missing (living people)
Year of birth missing (living people)
Living people
Commonwealth Games medallists in weightlifting
Weightlifters at the 1990 Commonwealth Games
20th-century Australian people
Medallists at the 1990 Commonwealth Games